The State Duma of the Federal Assembly of the Russian Federation of the 2nd convocation is a former convocation of the State Duma, Lower House of the Russian Parliament. The 2nd convocation meets at the State Duma building in Moscow, worked from December 17, 1995 – December 19, 1999.

Leadership

The first meeting of the 2nd State Duma was moderated by the oldest deputy, 73 year-old Grigory Galaziy.

On January 17, 1996, the parliament elected Gennady Seleznyov as the Chairman of the State Duma.

Chairman election

Factions and groups

Major legislation
Five Prime Ministers were approved by the State Duma of the second convocation.

August 10, 1996: Viktor Chernomyrdin re-approved as Prime Minister of Russia with 314 votes in favor.
April 24, 1998: Sergei Kiriyenko approved as Prime Minister of Russia with 251 votes in favor.
September 11, 1998: Yevgeny Primakov approved as Prime Minister of Russia with 317 votes in favor.
May 19, 1999: Sergei Stepashin approved as Prime Minister of Russia with 301 votes in favor.
August 16, 1999: Vladimir Putin approved as Prime Minister of Russia with 233 votes in favor.

Attempted impeachment of Boris Yeltsin
The procedure of impeachment of Boris Yeltsin was initiated in May 1999 on the basis of five charges: the collapse of the Soviet Union; 1993 constitutional crisis; the outbreak of War in Chechnya; weakening the country's defense and genocide of the Russian people.

Was formed a special Commission under the leadership of Vadim Filimonov.

On May 15, 1999, the vote to impeach Yeltsin was held, but none of the accusations received the necessary 300 votes.

Committees

In the State Duma of the 2nd convocation operated 27 Committees.

Committee on law and judicial and legal reform
Veterans Affairs Committee
Committee of Labour and Social Policy
Committee on Budget, Taxes Banking and Finance
Committee on Economic Policy
Committee on Property, Privatization and economic activity
Information Policy Committee
Committee on Energy, Transport and Communications
Committee on Industry, Construction and High Technology
Education and Science Committee
Culture and Tourism Committee
Health Protection Committee
Committee on Women, Family and Youth
Committee on Agrarian Issues
Defence Committee
Safety Committee
Committee on International Affairs
Committee on Commonwealth of Independent States Affairs and Relations with Compatriots
Committee on Rules and Organization of the State Duma
Problems of the North Committee
Committee on Geopolitics
Committee on Federation Affairs and Regional Policy 
Committee on Local Government 
The Environmental Committee
Committee on Natural Resources and the Environment
Committee on Public Associations and Religious Organizations
Committee for Nationalities

References

Convocations of the Russian State Duma
2nd State Duma of the Russian Federation